Stine Baun Eriksen (born 30 January 1995) is a Danish handball player who currently plays for Ringkøbing Håndbold.

References

1995 births
Living people
People from Randers
Danish female handball players
Sportspeople from the Central Denmark Region